Taiarahia Black is a New Zealand academic, who rose to a full professor at the Massey University. He is Māori, of Ngāi Tūhoe, Te Whānau a Apanui, Te Arawa, Ngāti Tūwharetoa and Ngāi Te Rangi descent.

Family life 
Black's son Otere Black plays rugby professionally.

Academic career

After completing an undergraduate degree at the University of Waikato, he moved to Massey in 1981. His PhD  'Kāore te aroha-- : te hua o te wānanga' , completed at Massey University in 2000, was the first PhD thesis at any university to be published in te reo Māori. Black later became a professor at Te Whare Wānanga o Awanuiārangi in Whakatāne.

Black was appointed to the council of Creative New Zealand by Maggie Barry, Minister for Arts, Culture and Heritage.

Selected works 
 Pardo, Natalia, Hildalene Wilson, Jonathan N. Procter, Erica Lattughi, and Taiarahia Black. "Bridging Māori indigenous knowledge and western geosciences to reduce social vulnerability in active volcanic regions." Journal of Applied Volcanology 4, no. 1 (2015): 5.
 Christensen, Ian S., Taiarahia E. Black, Arohia E. Durie, Mason H. Durie, Eljon D. Fitzgerald, and Julia T. Taiapa. "Maori Language in the Manawatu Whanganui Region: Analysis and Discussion of Preliminary Findings From the Te Hoe Nuku Roa Household Survey." He Pukenga Korero 2, no. 2 (2013).
 McKinley, Sheridan A., Taiarahia E. Black, Ian S. Christensen, and Pare Richardson. "Toi te Kupu: Maori Language Resource Materials." He Pukenga Korero 3, no. 1 (2013).

References

Living people
New Zealand Māori academics
Year of birth missing (living people)
University of Waikato alumni
Academic staff of the Massey University
Massey University alumni
Māori language revivalists
Ngāi Tūhoe people
Te Whānau-ā-Apanui people
Te Arawa people
Ngāti Tūwharetoa people
Ngāi Te Rangi people